Elzy is a surname and given name. Notable people with the name include:

Surname
Amanda Elzy (died 2004), American educator
Amanda Elzy High School, school in Mississippi, United States, named in her honor
Emma Elzy (1887 or 1888 - 1985), mother of Amanda and Ruby
Erma Elzy, American television and theatre director
Ruby Elzy (1908-1943), American singer

Given name or nickname
Elzy Burroughs (1771/77–1825), American stonemason, engineer, lighthouse builder and keeper 
Elzy Lay (1869-1934), American outlaw

See also
 Elzy, a place near Wick, Caithness, Scotland